Sir James Anthony Cropper KCVO (born 22 December 1938) is the former Lord-Lieutenant of Cumbria and Honorary President of James Cropper plc, speciality paper makers, of Burneside, a business founded by his great-great grandfather James Cropper in 1845.

He was educated at Eton College and Magdalene College, Cambridge (BA, 1962).

He served as High Sheriff of Westmorland for 1971.

He was appointed Knight Commander of the Royal Victorian Order (KCVO) in the 2011 New Years Honours List.

References 

1938 births
Living people
People educated at Eton College
Alumni of Magdalene College, Cambridge
Lord-Lieutenants of Cumbria
Knights Commander of the Royal Victorian Order
High Sheriffs of Westmorland